ASTB may refer to:
 N-succinylarginine dihydrolase, an enzyme
 Anyone Seen the Bridge?, an instrumental music piece by the Dave Matthews Band